Rocky Creek is a  long 1st order tributary to Lovills Creek in Surry County, North Carolina.

Variant names
According to the Geographic Names Information System, it has also been known historically as:
Osborns Creek

Course 
Rocky Creek rises about 1 mile north of Toast, North Carolina in Surry County and then flows southeast to join Lovills Creek at Mount Airy.

Watershed 
Rocky Creek drains  of area, receives about 47.4 in/year of precipitation, has a wetness index of 364.58, and is about 30% forested.

See also 
 List of North Carolina Rivers

References 

Rivers of Surry County, North Carolina
Rivers of North Carolina